Rejepmyrat Agabaýew (born 1 August 1973) is a professional Turkmenistani football player. Now working as a coach in FC Okzhetpes in Kazakhstan.

National team 
He has represented the Turkmenistan national football team. Rejepmyrat participated in the largest ever win for Turkmenistan, a match at home against Afghanistani national football team in which Agabaýew scored one of Turkmenistan's eleven goals.

International goals

References

External links
 

1973 births
Living people
Soviet footballers
Turkmenistan footballers
Turkmenistan international footballers
Turkmenistan expatriate footballers
Expatriate footballers in Kazakhstan
Turkmenistan expatriate sportspeople in Kazakhstan
Footballers at the 1994 Asian Games
Footballers at the 1998 Asian Games
Kazakhstan Premier League players
FC Kairat players
FC Kyzylzhar players
FC Atyrau players
Association football forwards
Asian Games competitors for Turkmenistan